Vatica rassak is a tree in the family Dipterocarpaceae, native to Maritime Southeast Asia.

Description
The inflorescences bear cream flowers. In Borneo, a newly discovered, unnamed special caterpillar makes use of the poisonous resin from this tree to build a cocoon.

Distribution and habitat
Vatica rassak is native to Borneo, Java, the Maluku Islands, Sulawesi, New Guinea and the Philippines.

References

rassak
Flora of Malesia
Flora of New Guinea
Plants described in 1840